HD 20644 is a suspected binary star system in the constellation Aries. It has an orange hue and is visible to the naked eye with an apparent visual magnitude of 4.47. The system is located at a distance of approximately 540 light years from the Sun based on parallax, but is drifting closer with a radial velocity of −3 km/s.

The visible component is an aging giant star with a stellar classification of K3IIIa Ba0.5, where the suffix notation indicates this is a mild barium star. The atmosphere of this star is enriched with s-process elements that are posited to have been transferred from what is now a white dwarf companion when it evolved along the asymptotic giant branch (AGB). Alternatively, this star may itself be on the AGB.

HD 20644 is about 350 million years old with three times the mass of the Sun and is spinning with a projected rotational velocity of 1.4 km/s. With the supply of hydrogen at its core exhausted, it has expanded to 75 times the Sun's radius. It is radiating 1,292 times the luminosity of the Sun from its photosphere at an effective temperature of 3,987 K.

References

K-type giants
Barium stars
Aries (constellation)
Durchmusterung objects
020644
015549
0999